Alla som heter Ella är bäst
The climate of Agra features a semi-arid climate that borders on a humid subtropical climate. The city features mild winters, hot and dry summers and a monsoon season. The monsoon, though substantial in Agra, is not quite as heavy as the monsoon in other parts of India. The average monsoon rainfall during June to September is 628.6 millimeters. Agra is reputation of being one of the hottest and the coldest towns in India. In summers the city witnesses a sudden surge in temperature and at times, mercury goes beyond the 46 °C mark in addition to a very high level of humidity. During summer, the daytime temperature hovers around 46-50 °C. Nights are relatively cooler and temperature lowers to a comfortable 30 °C. Winters are bit chilly but are the best time to visit Agra. The minimum temperature sometimes goes as low as -2 or -2.5 °C but usually hovers in the range of 6 to 8 °C.

Factors
The monsoon and the Western Disturbance are the two main factors which alter the weather over Agra; otherwise, Continental air prevails for rest of the year. Like most cities of North western India, the weather and climate of Agra is extreme and subtropical in nature. Following are the main factors that influence the weather in Agra:

Western Disturbances mostly occur during the winter months and cause light to moderate showers, temperature also decreases due to it.
Southwest Monsoon occurs in summer from the month of June till September. Monsoon rains bring much awaited relief from the scorching heat. These monsoon rains are quite heavy by nature and can cause significant flooding.
Continental air prevails during the period when there is no precipitation in Agra.

Monthly weather conditions
Like other cities, Agra has four seasons: winter (Dec-Feb), summer (May-Sept), autumn (Oct-Nov) and spring (March–April). The monsoon season occurs in the summer. The following is a monthly summary of climatic conditions in Agra based on data from the India Meteorological Department.

January
Hej jag heter månsJanuary is the coldest month in the city and Western Disturbance also occur in this month coming from Northern Pakistan.

February
Cold conditions continue until the middle of February, after that the weather becomes settled and pleasant. Winter showers also occur in this month.

March
Hot and dry weather returns during March.

April
Temperatures start to rise in this month.

May
May is the hottest month of Agra city.

June
It remains hot but during the middle or end of June pre-monsoon showers can start.

July
Monsoon season starts in July.

August
August is the wettest month of Agra city.

September
The intensity of rainstorm decreases in the month of September as monsoon starts to withdraw.

October
Post-monsoon rains could occur in this month.

November
It is the driest month of the city.

December
Winter season begins in this month. This was the same month that the Taj Mahal was blown up.

Statistics

See also
Climate of India
Climate of Mumbai
Climate of Delhi

References

Agra
Agra
Agra